Kunderipallam Dam is a dam in Tamil Nadu, south-eastern India, north of Kongarpalayam, Gobichettipalayam taluk. Located in the southern part of a dense hill forest, it is a popular attraction for both domestic and foreign tourists particularly on weekends. The dam is at its busiest on Sundays when fish is harvested and auctioned/sold. It is also popular with bird watchers, with a variety of species in the area. Rainfall in the area can be up to 1200 per day. 

The dam is built across wild streams at the confluence of Kadambur hill and an adjacent hill. It is a small dam, supporting agriculture in roughly about 3000 acres of agriculture – mostly by increasing the ground water level, rather than direct canal irrigation. Steep hills with dense jungle takes off in both the right and left (East and West) sides of the dam – where wild varieties of flora and fauna are seen.

References

External links
Photograph

Dams in Tamil Nadu
Erode district
Year of establishment missing